Niourk (published 1957) is a science fiction novel by the French writer Stefan Wul. It first appeared as one of the Fleuve Noir "Anticipation" novels, a series published in France since 1951 which reflected the authors' attitudes towards the supposed post war rise of a "technocracy" in the country.

Plot
It presents a future in which Earth is deserted and only small bands of hunter-gatherer tribes exist, and live on paleolithic level.

The name of the novel, "Niourk", comes from the pronunciation of the name of New York City.

The "Black Child" lives with his tribe in the dry bottom of the Caribbean Sea, Cuba and Haiti are mountain ranges.  Considered a mutant because of his skin colour he is sentenced to die by the tribal shaman when the shaman has returned from his pilgrimage to the city of the gods.  When the shaman does not come back the child defies taboo and follows the shaman's route into the ruins of an abandoned city.  There he comes into contact with pre-apocalyptic human artefacts.  He picks up a laser rifle. Black Child finds the frozen dead body of the shaman and, according to tribal custom, eats the shaman's brain and adds one of the shaman's vertebrae to the necklace of similar vertebrae that is the symbol of his power. By doing this the black child becomes the tribal shaman. The child is attacked by a bear, defends himself with the laser weapon and then, instead of killing it, tames the beast.  It becomes his companion.

In the meantime, driven from their usual hunting grounds by a wildfire which has driven off all the game, the tribe moves toward another hunting area, where they are attacked by intelligent, tentacled monsters mutated from octopuses by nuclear waste on the bottom of the, now nearly dry, Atlantic Ocean. Tribesmen kill one of the monsters, and eat it, which makes them stronger, faster and more intelligent. However, they are also heavily irradiated.

The Black Child returns to the tribe and saves them with the laser rifle from a larger monster attack, He then eats one of the monster's brains and begins to experience exponential transformation of his intellect and abilities, but is also heavily irradiated.

As they travel, the tribe meet a human (who they take to be a mad god) from a space-bound branch of mankind shipwrecked on earth. He directs them to New York before wandering off. On the trip there, all of the tribesmen die from acute radiation sickness. New York is a futuristic city full of functional autonomous machinery, there the Black Child meets two other humans from the shipwrecked crew. They heal the child, but in the process he develops tremendous intelligence, teaches himself to read, learns most of the human history and develops supra-human powers. He is increasingly able to manipulate matter and space, which enables him to "fly", go "through" walls and manipulate objects psycho-kinetically, he is able to be in many places simultaneously. He creates a space ship and sends his three-human companions home to Venus. Then recreates them, and all the members of his tribe and relocates the earth to the centre of the galaxy.  The final sentences of the book also reveal he created a copy of himself to accompany the real humans home to Venus.

Adaptations
A graphic novel adaptation by Olivier Vatine was published by Ankama Editions in 2012, and was translated into English by Dark Horse Comics in 2018.

References

External links
 French-language notes about the book

1957 French novels
1957 science fiction novels
French science fiction novels
Post-apocalyptic novels
Novels set in New York City
Works by Stefan Wul